Congresox is a genus of eels in the pike conger family, Muraenesocidae.  It currently contains these species:

 Congresox talabon (Cuvier, 1829) (yellow pike conger)
 Congresox talabonoides (Bleeker, 1853) (Indian pike conger)

References

 

Muraenesocidae
Marine fish genera